Stienes Longin (born 30 July 1991 in Leuven, Flemish Brabant) is a Belgian professional racing driver. Longin currently competes in the NASCAR Whelen Euro Series driving the No. 11 Chevrolet Camaro for PK Carsport in the Elite 1 class and in Belcar Endurance Championship driving the No. 11 Norma M20 FC for Krafft Racing. He previously won the Euro Series Elite 2 championship in 2016. He is also a one-time winner at the 24 Hours of Zolder, having scored his first overall victory in 2019. He is the son of former FIA GT driver Bert Longin.

Racing career
Longin started his racing career in the Belgian Racing Drivers Club. In 2013 he was fielded by Hoppa Racing in a Renault Clio. The following year, in a BMW M3, Longin won the championship in Division 3. In 2014 Longin made his debut in the NASCAR Whelen Euro Series as a part of the PK Carsport formation. At Tours Speedway Longin finished second, behind Denis Dupont, in the second Elite 2 race. At the Nürburgring the Belgian driver scored another two top-ten finishes. Longin's first appearance at the 24 Hours of Zolder came in 2014. The Belgian driver made his debut for the Australian MARC Cars formation with teammates Kris Van Kelst, Ryan McLeod, Hadrian Morall, and Mich Benton. The team finished twelfth overall, second in class.

In 2015 Longin combined a full season in the NASCAR Whelen Euro Series with a partial season in the Belgian Racing Drivers Club. In the BGDC Longin won at Circuit Zolder, Dijon-Prenois and Spa-Francorchamps. He won his first NASCAR race at Tours Speedway. Scoring another five podium finishes he secured fourth place in the championship. Longin also participated in the revived Belcar Trophy in a BMW M235i Racing Cup. The team finished third in the second race of the season, placing fourth in the championship.

In the 2016 season, Longin dominated the Elite 2 class as he won 8 races out of 12 on his way to win the Elite 2 championship that year. He moved up to the Elite 1 class the following year to replace his father Bert in PK Carsport's No. 11 team and would finish in 5th in the Championship having scored 3 podium finishes in his debut season in Elite 1. Longin once again finished in 5th in the Championship the following year having scored 2 podium finishes.

In the 2019 season, Longin scored his first pole position in the Elite 1 class at Brands Hatch before leading the Elite 1 Championship for the first time in his career at Most after scoring six second-place finishes in the first eight races of the season. Longin also won the 24 Hours of Zolder in the same year, scoring the win alongside his father Bert (who scored his sixth victory in the event, tying Anthony Kumpen and Marc Goossens for the most wins), Christoff Corten, and Giorgio Maggi. On the final race of the season at Circuit Zolder, Longin would score his first victory in the Elite 1 class in the rain-affected race to secure a second place finish in the championship.

Complete motorsports results

Complete 24 Hours of Zolder results

NASCAR
(key) (Bold – Pole position awarded by qualifying time. Italics – Pole position earned by points standings or practice time. * – Most laps led.)

Whelen Euro Series - Elite 1

Whelen Euro Series - Elite 2

References

External links

Career summary on Driver Database

1991 births
Sportspeople from Leuven
Belgian racing drivers
NASCAR drivers
Living people
24H Series drivers